Gion Shouja no Kane ga Naru (祇園盛者の鐘が鳴る; The Gion Temple's Bells Toll) is an Alice Nine extended play that was released on November 17, 2004. It was later re-released on the King Records label on November 23, 2005.

Track listing
 Gradation (グラデーション)
 Gokusai Gokushiki Gokudouka (極彩極色極道歌<G3>; Brilliantly Coloured Immoral Poem)
 Akai Kazeguruma (朱い風車; Red Pinwheel)
 Honjitsu wa Seiten Nari (本日ハ晴天ナリ; Today the Sky Cleared)
 H.A.N.A.B.I. (Fireworks)

Notes
Gion Shouja no Kane ga Naru was re-released later in 2005.
The first pressings came with a special packaging.

References

Alice Nine albums
King Records (Japan) EPs
2004 EPs